Nieuw-Dordrecht is a village in the Netherlands and it is part of the Emmen municipality in Drenthe. The village is home to Museum Collectie Brands, a museum which houses the extensive collection of items collected and gathered by Jans Brands.

History 
In 1932, it was home to 832 people. In the 1950s, the economy became based on the textile industry.

In 2011, Museum Collectie Brands opened in Nieuw-Dordrecht. It contains the collection of Jan Brands who collected over 20,000 object and more than 50,000 books which covered his entire farm.

Gallery

References

Populated places in Drenthe
Emmen, Netherlands
1856 establishments in the Netherlands